The 2017 St Kilda Football Club season was the 121st in the club's history. Coached by Alan Richardson and captained by Jarryn Geary, they competed in the AFL's 2017 Toyota Premiership Season.

Squad

Season summary

Pre-season

Regular season

Ladder

References

External links
 
 Listing of St Kilda game results in 2017

St Kilda Football Club seasons
2017 Australian Football League season